Miceli is an Italian surname. Notable people with the surname include:

Damien Miceli (born 1984), Belgian football player
Debrah Miceli (born 1963), American wrestler and monster truck driver
Felisa Miceli (born 1953), Argentine economist
Jim Miceli (1935–2018), American politician
Jim Miceli (born 1957), American football coach
John Miceli, American drummer for the Neverland Express, Meat Loaf and Rainbow
Justine Miceli (born 1959), American actress
Luigi Miceli (1824–1906), Italian patriot, politician and military
Martina Miceli (born 1973), Italian female water polo defender
Nicola Miceli (born 1971), Italian former professional racing cyclist
Salvatore Miceli, a member of the Sicilian Mafia
Salvatore Miceli (born 1974), retired Italian footballer
Stefano Miceli (born 1975), Italian classical pianist and conductor
Tony Miceli (born 1960), American jazz vibraphonist, percussionist, educator, and composer
Vincent Miceli (1915–1991), American theologian and philosopher
Vito Miceli (1916–1990), Italian general and politician
Walter Miceli, Brazilian stadium announcer

Italian-language surnames